Oscar Ichazo (July 24, 1931 in Bolivia – March 26, 2020 in Kihei, Hawaii, USA) was a Bolivian and American philosopher and the originator of Integral Philosophy. In 1968, Ichazo founded the Arica School in Chile. An American headquarters was later established in New York.

Arica School
The Arica School, also known as the Arica Institute (which is its incorporated educational organization) or simply as Arica, is a Human Potential Movement group founded by Ichazo in 1968. The school is named after the city of Arica, Chile, where Ichazo once lived and where he led an intensive months-long training in 1970 and 1971 before settling in the United States where the Arica Institute (incorporated in 1971) has since been headquartered.

The Arica School can be considered, as Ramparts magazine put it in 1973, "A body of techniques for cosmic consciousness-raising and an ideology to relate to the world in an awakened way."

Origins
The Arica School's origins began in 1956 when groups of people formed in major cities in South America to study the theory and method that Ichazo was proposing. For fourteen years these different groups studied his teachings. In 1968, Ichazo presented lectures on his theories of Protoanalysis and the ego-fixations at the Institute of Applied Psychology in Santiago, Chile.

Ichazo's theories are based upon such traditional metaphysical questions such as: "What is humankind?"; "What is the supreme good of humanity?"; and "What is the truth that gives meaning and value to human life?"

Protoanalysis
The tools that the Arica School teaches are called the “Protoanalytical Theory, System and Method” or "Protoanalysis". Before 1980, the term "protoanalysis" was misunderstood to be narrower in scope, used specifically as the name for Ichazo's theory of types, from which the Enneagram of Personality was derived. 

In protoanalysis, Ichazo described nine ways in which a person's ego becomes fixated within the psyche at an early stage of life. For each person, one of these "ego fixations" then becomes the core of a self-image around which their psychological  personality develops. Each fixation is also supported at the emotional level by a particular passion. Ichazo described these passions as emotional energy in disarray, much like a sickness. The principal psychological connections between the nine ego fixations can be mapped using the points, lines, and circle of the enneagram figure.

Ichazo's teachings are designed to help people transcend their identification with — and the suffering caused by — their own mechanistic thought and behavior patterns. His theories about the fixations are founded on the premise that all life seeks to continue and perpetuate itself and that the human psyche must follow universal laws of reality. The study of the fixations does not produce a typology. Rather, it analyzes the characteristics of the human ego based on the three instincts known as conservation, relation, and adaptation, and the two poles of our psychic life: our sexuality or sense of life continuation, and our spirituality, or sense of internal unity.

Ichazo understood the fixations as instinctual points that have been hurt. The primary difference between modern psychology and his theories is that he proposed a model of the psyche where the instincts, when affected, injured or handicapped, can be liberated to accomplish Unity, whereas modern psychology has preferred to focus on observed behavior.

According to Ichazo, a person's fixation derives from childhood subjective experience (self-perception) of psychological trauma when expectations are not met in each of the instincts. Young children are self-centered and thus experience disappointment in their expectations because of one of three fundamental attitudes: attracted, unattracted, disinterested. From such experiences, mechanistic thought and behavior patterns arise as an attempted defense against the recurrence of the trauma. By understanding the fixations — and practicing self-observation — it is believed that a person can reduce or even transcend suffering and the fixations' hold on the mind.

Integral Philosophy
Integral Philosophy is a new philosophical tradition that presents a complete analysis of the human condition from the lowest levels of the human process to the highest States of Enlightenment (Gk. Theosis). This body of teaching includes the analysis that Ichazo originally termed Protoanalysis, and Ichazo's Enneagram of Personality. In Ichazo's teachings the enneagram figure was initially called an enneagon.

In a 1954 interview, Ichazo said that he had achieved insight into mechanistic and repetitive thought and behavior patterns. These processes can be understood in connection with the enneagram figure, classical philosophy and what he called "Trialectical Logic," which analyzes reality on the basis of cycles.

Basic theory
The entire theory is referred to as based on the idea of the Innate Structure of Mind. That is, the questions come from the Instincts and the Instincts are a result of a pre-existing structure that is the foundation of Mind itself. It is a concept considered logical because there must be a pre-existing order if all minds share essential similarities.

Ichazo refined the ancient concept that a human soul has components by approaching the issue through three instinctual questions that he considered basic to human existence: "How am I?", "Who am I with?", "What am I doing?"  Ichazo labeled these conservation, relations, and syntony (later modified to adaptation). Recognizing interactions among the three, he developed a 3 x 3 = 9 component system, which he correlated with several schemas that have long existed in diverse fields: spectrum of light, chakras, physiological systems, and the enneagram.

For example, each component of the psyche was assigned a corresponding color, which was reinforced through a wide variety of self-development exercises. The Hypergnostic (exaggerated perception) meditation utilized the ancient notion of vertically arranged chakras, expanding the seven chakra system widely used in Hindu meditation into nine by adding the sacrum and the nape of the neck. Modern biology was incorporated into the theory by associating the hypergnostic rings (chakras) with anatomy rather than energy centers.

For self-observation of habitual patterns, Ichazo employed the enneagram, among other tools. Transformative practices sometimes involved linking a specific mudra and/or bija with each of the nine points of the enneagram. During the first three decades or so, most aspects of his theory that were mapped onto the enneagram were circular mappings (e.g., closing of the spectrum into a circular Rainbow Eye) that involved little or no utilization of the interconnecting lines that constitute the enneagram's form. In other words, most of the maps were enneagons rather than enneagrams (refer to enneagram figure for drawings that show the difference).

Enneagram of Personality

Ichazo is considered by many to be the father of the Enneagram of Personality (usually just called the Enneagram) movement which uses an enneagram figure. The United States Court of Appeals ruled that Ichazo is the original author of the application of the enneagram figure to a theory of ego fixations (which are the precursor to personality disorders). However, this ruling denied copyright injunction under the "fair use" doctrine of copyright law. Because the enneagram symbol is a discovery (not an invention), the legal issue was not use of the symbol but rather the copyrightability of specific "enneagrams", meaning symbol plus descriptive words (or other information) associated with each point. Ichazo had earlier described the enneagrams as a set of immutable laws but he had also said that he "developed" the enneagrams.

Ichazo has applied the enneagram figure in connection with his theory of mechanical ego mechanisms which grow out of psychological traumas suffered at an early age in specific aspects of the human psyche. In his basic theory, these aspects of the human psyche include the sense of well-being (conservation instinct); the sense of relations with others (relation instinct); and the sense of adapting to our environment (adaptation instinct). Ichazo's goal with regard to the study of the enneagram is to facilitate the recognition of repetitive, mechanistic thinking and behavior in a person's psychological process and to eliminate the suffering rooted in the attachment to, and identification with, these mechanisms (which, Ichazo teaches, attempt to protect us from suffering but actually tend to perpetuate it).

The popular use of the Enneagram of Personality (as contrasted with the use of enneagrams within the Arica School) began principally with Claudio Naranjo who had studied with Ichazo in Chile. Ichazo considered Naranjo's understanding of the Enneagram to be limited and incomplete. Naranjo's major contribution to the Enneagram of Personality was his addition of defense mechanisms to the model developed by Ichazo: "His contribution to the Enneagram successfully joined the insight and methods of a mystical path of transformation with the intellectual power of a Western psychological model."

In 1992 intellectual copyright for the Enneagram of Personality was denied to Ichazo on the basis that he had published statements that his theories were factual, and facts cannot be copyrighted. The litigation, however, confirmed Oscar Ichazo as the source of the Enneagram of Personality and Fixations, its application, meaning, and related material.

Essence and ego
Like some other systems of self-actualization, Arica works with the (ultimately illusory) separation of essence and ego. An important aspect of this work is to observe one's habits and reactions in accordance with a typology of nine. However, Ichazo referred to the characterizations as "fixations" rather than "personality types" and he repeatedly emphasized that every human being contains all nine types ("we have to awaken all the nine positions"). The fixation was simply a key to self-discovery, not a form of identity like one's sun sign in astrology.

Influences
Although some modern Enneagram of Personality writers have suggested that Ichazo's teachings are derived, in part, from those of Gurdjieff's Fourth Way work, Ichazo denied this in his "Letter to the Transpersonal Community." In July 1990, as part of a settlement with Dimension Books, each of the authors who were part of the lawsuit agreed in writing that "Oscar Ichazo is the sole originator of the theory of the ego fixations and the system of enneagons representing the different functions of the human Psyche."

Although the symbolism of the number 9 is ancient, there does not appear to be any evidence for the enneagram figure before Gurdjieff in Sufism or elsewhere.

Bibliography

See also
 Chua K'a, a three-part bodywork approach developed by Óscar Ichazo
 The Holy Mountain, a 1973 film which Oscar Ichazo helped with by training the staff in various spiritual exercises

References

Citations

Works cited

  Reprinted in

Further reading

 - John C. Lilly discusses the teaching methods of Óscar Ichazo and relates his personal reactions to them.

External links
 

1931 births
2020 deaths
20th-century philosophers
21st-century philosophers
Bolivian expatriates in the United States
Bolivian male writers
Bolivian philosophers
Human Potential Movement